Julia Dykins  may refer to:

Julia Lennon, lived as the wife of John Dykins; mother of John Lennon
Julia Baird, née Julia Dykins, teacher